Roderick Thomas (born 14 February 1954) is a New Zealand cricketer. He played in sixteen first-class and three List A matches for Central Districts from 1975 to 1978.

See also
 List of Central Districts representative cricketers

References

External links
 

1954 births
Living people
New Zealand cricketers
Central Districts cricketers
Cricketers from Picton, New Zealand